In the context of an internal combustion engine, a rocker arm is a valvetrain component that typically transfers the motion of a pushrod to the corresponding intake/exhaust valve.

Rocker arms in automobiles are typically made from stamped steel, or aluminum in higher-revving applications. Some rocker arms (called roller rockers) include a bearing at the contact point, to reduce wear and friction at the contact point.

Overview
In the typical use-case of an overhead valve (pushrod) engine, the camshaft at the bottom of the engine pushes the pushrod upwards. The top of the pushrod presses upwards on one side of the rocker arm (located at the top of the engine), which causes the rocker arm to rotate. This rotation causes the other end of the rocker arm to press downwards on the top of the valve, which opens the valve by moving it downwards.

A roller rocker is a rocker arm that uses needle bearings (or a single bearing ball in older engines) at the contact point between the rocker and the valve, instead of metal sliding on metal. This reduces friction, uneven wear and "bell-mouthing" of the valve guide. Roller rockers can also be used in overhead cam engines. However, these generally have the roller at the point where the cam lobe contacts the rocker, rather than at the point where the rocker contacts the valve stem.

Friction may be reduced at the point of contact with the valve stem by a roller tip. A similar arrangement transfers the motion via another roller tip to a second rocker arm. This rotates about the rocker shaft, and transfers the motion via a tappet to the valve.

Some overhead camshaft engines employ short rocker arms, also known as fingers, in which the cam lobe pushes down (rather than up) on the rocker arm to open the valve. On this type of rocker arm, the fulcrum is at the end rather than the middle, while the cam acts on the middle of the arm. The opposite end opens the valve. These types of rocker arms are particularly common on overhead camshaft engines, and are often used instead of direct tappets. This rocker arm configuration is employed in SOHC engines such as Ford 5.4 L 3v and Ford Zetec RoCam.

Rocker ratio 
The rocker ratio is the distance travelled by the valve divided by the distance travelled by the pushrod effective. The ratio is determined by the ratio of the distances from the rocker arm's pivot point to the point where it touches the valve and the point where it touches the pushrod/camshaft. A rocker ratio greater than one essentially increases the camshaft's lift.

Current automotive design favors rocker arm ratios of about 1.5:1 to 1.8:1. However, in the past smaller positive ratios have been used, including a 1:1 (neutral ratio) in many engines prior to the 1950s, and ratios less than 1 (valve lift smaller than the cam lift) have also been used at times.

Materials

Mass-produced car engines traditionally used  a stamped steel construction for the rocker arms, due to the lower cost of production.

Rocker arms contribute to the reciprocating weight of the valvetrain, which can become problematic at higher engine speeds (RPM). For this reason, aluminum is often in engines that operate at higher RPM. Upgraded bearings for the rocker arm's fulcrum are also sometimes used in engines operating at high RPM.

Diesel truck engines often use rocker arms made from cast iron (usually ductile), or forged carbon steel.

See also

 Camshaft
 Poppet valve
 Pushrod
 Tappet

References 

Valvetrain